Agama knobeli, the southern rock agama, is a species of lizard in the family Agamidae. It is a small lizard found in Namibia.

References

Agama (genus)
Reptiles described in 1921
Taxa named by George Albert Boulenger
Taxa named by John Hyacinth Power